Bernina Diavolezza railway station is a railway station in the municipality of Pontresina, in the Swiss canton of Graubünden. It is located on the Bernina line of the Rhaetian Railway, at the foot of the Diavolezza mountain, as well as near the Diavolezza and Lagalb ski region.

The station has a single through track with a single platform and station building. The valley station for a cable car to the top of Diavolezza is located across the street from station. In the summer trailheads for hiking are located nearby.

The station was opened in 1956, at the same time as the adjacent cable car, and was originally also a passing station. However it relinquished that role to  when that station was opened.

Services
The following services stop at Bernina Diavolezza:

 Regio: hourly service between St. Moritz and Tirano.

References

External links
 
 

Railway stations in Switzerland opened in 1910
Railway stations in Graubünden
Rhaetian Railway stations